Raven is a surname, and may refer to:

Andrew Raven (1959-2005), Scottish conservationist, son of John
Arlene Raven, art historian, author and feminist
Bertram Raven (born 1926), American academic
Charles Raven (disambiguation)
Charlotte Raven, British author and journalist
Cliff Raven, pioneering American tattoo artist
David Raven (disambiguation)
Eddy Raven (born 1944), American singer and songwriter
Elsa Raven (1929–2020), American actress
Ernst Raven (1804–1881), immigrant from Germany who became a prominent resident of Texas
John Raven (1914–1980), English classical scholar and amateur botanist, father of Andrew and Sarah
John Albert Raven (born 1941), British botanist
John C. Raven (1902–1970), English psychologist
Josh Ravin (born 1988), American professional baseball player
Julius A. Raven (1918–1942), United States navy officer, pilot, and Distinguished Flying Cross and Air Medal recipient
Leonard Raven-Hill, English artist and illustrator
Marion Raven (born 1984), Norwegian singer-songwriter and former child actress
Paul Raven (disambiguation)
Peter H. Raven (born 1936), botanist and environmentalist
Robert J. Raven, Australian arachnologist
Sarah Raven (born 1963), gardener, cook and writer, daughter of John 
Simon Raven, novelist, journalist and dramatist
Vincent Raven (1859–1934), British locomotive engineer

See also
Raven (disambiguation)

Surnames from nicknames